Nikolai Saltykov was a Russian Imperial and Soviet actor and director.

Selected filmography 
 1915 — Antichrist
 1915 — Czar Ivan the Terrible
 1923 — Locksmith and Chancellor
 1924 — Story of Seven Who Were Hanged
 1926 — The Bay of Death

References

External links 
 Николай Салтыков on kino-teatr.ru

Russian male film actors
20th-century Russian male actors
1886 births
1927 deaths